is a futuristic soccer game first released in arcades on February 14, 1992. It was available on the Neo Geo on March 13 the same year and later for the Neo Geo CD on March 31, 1995.

Gameplay 

It is a futuristic soccer game that uses either bionic people or cyborgs for the players. It is a two-player game where you pick a home land from one of eight countries. After selecting one of two stadiums, either a dome or an open field, the 5-on-5 soccer match begins with a goalie for each team. You can hold either A for a power shot while on offense, or A for a super shot to disable opponents while on defense. You can perform tackle and slide. Captain wears a kerchief, can't shoot and can make super shot. Power shots rebound from walls except walls behind the goalie.

Rules 
There are no fouls. Throw-in is made in case of the ball landing outside of field line. Match time is 2 min 30 sec.

Teams 
There are 8 teams, which differ by color, super shots and, possibly, some parameters.

 (purple and white)
 (yellow and black)
 (yellow and purple)
 (pink and yellow-green)
 (yellow-green and yellow)
 (pink and blue)
 (blue and yellow-green)
 (red and white)

Super shots 
USA and England: super shot flies on a "figure eight" trajectory.

Italy and Germany: super shot flies on sinewave.

Spain and Brazil: super shot is energy sphere surrounded by eight small balls.

Korea and Japan: super shot flies in a circle behind captain and flies straight.

Neo Geo CD version 
It is possible to choose the difficulty level: Beginner, Normal, Hard, MVS. A match consists of 2 periods. It is possible to set period time (15, 30, 45 or 90 min), but it is not actual minutes. The half time shows are humorous monochrome skits showing unlucky attempts of engineers to build robots. Also, there are no women on the score screen.

Reception 

In Japan, Game Machine listed Soccer Brawl on their April 1, 1992 issue as being the eighth most-successful table arcade unit of the month, outperforming titles such as Hat Trick Hero. In North America, Play Meter listed the game in their April 1994 issue to be the sixty most-popular arcade game at the time. The title received mostly positive reception from both critics and reviewers alike since its initial release in arcades and Neo Geo AES.

In 2014, HobbyConsolas identified Soccer Brawl as one of the twenty best games for the Neo Geo CD.

See also
Super Sidekicks

Notes

References

External links 
 Soccer Brawl at GameFAQs
 Soccer Brawl at Giant Bomb
 Soccer Brawl at Killer List of Videogames
 Soccer Brawl at MobyGames

1992 video games
ACA Neo Geo games
Arcade video games
D4 Enterprise games
Fantasy sports video games
Head-to-head arcade video games
Multiplayer and single-player video games
Neo Geo games
Neo Geo CD games
Nintendo Switch games
PlayStation Network games
PlayStation 4 games
SNK games
Virtual Console games
Video games developed in Japan
Xbox One games
Hamster Corporation games